Paul Frederick Straub was a Surgeon in the United States Army and a Medal of Honor recipient for his actions in the Philippine–American War.

He also worked in the Office of the Surgeon General; his papers from his time there can be found at the National Library of Medicine.

Medal of Honor citation
Rank and organization: Surgeon. 36th Infantry, U.S. Volunteers. Place and date: At Alos, Zambales, Luzon, Philippine Islands, December 21, 1899. Entered service at: Iowa. Birth: Germany. Date of issue: October 6, 1906.

Citation:

Voluntarily exposed himself to a hot fire from the enemy in repelling with pistol fire an insurgent attack and at great risk of his own life went under fire to the rescue of a wounded officer and carried him to a place of safety.

See also
List of Medal of Honor recipients
List of Philippine–American War Medal of Honor recipients

References

External links

Iowa Medal of Honor Heroes
 Army Medical Library Director's Correspondence (1918-1932)—National Library of Medicine finding aid

1865 births
1937 deaths
United States Army Medal of Honor recipients
United States Army officers
German emigrants to the United States
American military personnel of the Philippine–American War
German-born Medal of Honor recipients
Philippine–American War recipients of the Medal of Honor